Karyan (also Romanized as Karyān; also known as Kharīān, Kūreyān, Kūrīān, and Kūrīyān) is a village in Bazarjan Rural District, in the Central District of Tafresh County, Markazi Province, Iran. At the 2006 census, its population was 320, in 88 families.

References 

Populated places in Tafresh County